William Goodwin (January 1892 – 9 July 1951) was an English footballer. His regular position was as a forward. He was born in Staveley, Derbyshire. He played in the Football League for Manchester United, and Southend United.

Goodwin played for Exeter City before joining Manchester United for a fee of £640 in June 1920. He played seven games for United's first team. His debut was a defeat at home to Bolton Wanderers in August 1920. He left United in August 1922, joining Southend United, where he was top scorer the following season with 22 goals. He remained with Southend until August 1927 when he joined Dartford.

He later joined Oldham Athletic and Congleton Town from where he joined Mossley. He later rejoined Mossley from Droylsden.

References

1892 births
1951 deaths
People from Staveley, Derbyshire
Footballers from Derbyshire
English footballers
Association football forwards
Chesterfield F.C. players
Blackburn Rovers F.C. players
Exeter City F.C. players
Manchester United F.C. players
Southend United F.C. players
Dartford F.C. players
Oldham Athletic A.F.C. players
Congleton Town F.C. players
Mossley A.F.C. players
Droylsden F.C. players
English Football League players